Saliana is a genus of grass skippers in the family Hesperiidae.

Species
Saliana antoninus (Latreille, [1824])
Saliana chiomara (Hewitson, 1867)
Saliana covancae Mielke, 1970
Saliana esperi Evans, 1955
Saliana fischer (Latreille, [1824])
Saliana fusta Evans, 1955
Saliana hewitsoni (Riley, 1926)
Saliana longirostris (Sepp, [1840])
Saliana mamurra (Plötz, 1886)
Saliana mathiolus (Herrich-Scäffer, 1869)
Saliana morsa Evans, 1955
Saliana nigel Evans, 1955
Saliana placens (Butler, 1874)
Saliana sala Evans, 1955
Saliana saladin Evans, 1955
Saliana salius (Cramer, [1775])
Saliana salona Evans, 1955
Saliana severus (Mabille, 1895)
Saliana triangularis (Kaye, 1914)
Saliana vixen Evans, 1955

References

External links
Natural History Museum Lepidoptera genus database

Hesperiinae
Hesperiidae genera
Taxa named by William Harry Evans